Jonathan Steingard (born 1983) is a Canadian musician who was the lead vocalist and lead guitarist for the Christian pop-punk band Hawk Nelson, which he joined in October 2004, replacing the former guitarist David Clark. He took over vocal duties upon Jason Dunn's departure in March 2012, until his own departure in 2020.

Career
His side projects include September Satellite, The Natural Anthem, two albums entitled Fox Run, Under The Canopy and an EP Atlantis. Steingard's first principal side project, Fox Run, released on October 25, 2006, utilizes a large number of instruments for a unique sound. His second album Under The Canopy, released on November 25, 2008, is rather an emotional alternative one rather than the pop-punk genre of Hawk Nelson, while three singles from Under The Canopy was featured in the Atlantis EP released on November 11, 2008, and available for free download. 

Steingard served as a judge for The 13th and 14th Annual Independent Music Awards in 2014 and 2015.

Personal life
The oldest of three children, Steingard started playing the guitar at the age of 9. He plays PRS Guitars, Matchless and Metroamp Amps, Pedaltrain Pedalboards, and GHS Strings. His touring PRS guitars include an SC245, a Mira, and a Chris Henderson Model. 

Steingard married Jessica Hubbard in March 2007.

On May 20, 2020, Steingard announced on Instagram that he no longer believes in God, but remains open to believing again in the future.

References

External links
 
 Jonathan Steingard's Website
 Hawk Nelson Dot Com the band's website -the website contains their tour dates, biographies, their "vodcasts", and the latest news. You can also hear some of their music there.
 Jonathan Steingard's MP3 Music Downloads at his side project website.
 Jonathan's page on the PRS Guitars Website Jonathan is a PRS Guitars Endorsee.

1983 births
Canadian former Christians
Canadian people of Swedish descent
Living people
Canadian performers of Christian music
Place of birth missing (living people)
Canadian atheists